Novoye Argvani is a rural locality (a selo) in Argvaninsky Selsoviet, Gumbetovsky District, Republic of Dagestan, Russia. The population was 1,643 as of 2010. There are 28 streets.

Geography 
Novoye Argvani is located 23 km east of Mekhelta (the district's administrative centre) by road. Argvani and Gadari are the nearest rural localities.

References 

Rural localities in Gumbetovsky District